A Pauper in Paradise is the fifth studio album by Italian-Canadian singer Gino Vannelli, released in 1977. It was notable for including contributions by the Royal Philharmonic Orchestra on the second side, including a fifteen-minute title track symphony that took Gino five months to write, and which led A&M to offer a warning to Gino to expand his appeal or face rapid declines in album sales that since Powerful People had been a steady 300,000 albums per release.

Track listing

Detailed personnel
Art Direction – Fabio Nicoli, Roland Young (3)
Backing Vocals – Jay Stone, Joanie Bartels
Backing Vocals, Design, Artwork – Joanne Jayde
Drums – Casey Scheuerell
Engineer – John Kurlander (tracks: 7 to 10), Norm Kinney
Engineer [Assistent] – Steve Prestage
Engineer [Re-mix] – Jon Kelly
Keyboards – Chris Rhyne
Leader – Barry Griffiths (tracks: 7 to 10)
Lyrics By, Music By – Gino Vannelli
Mastered By – Bernie Grundman
Orchestra – The Royal Philharmonic Orchestra (tracks: 7 to 10)
Orchestrated By, Conductor – Don Sebesky (tracks: 7 to 10)
Percussion – Dido* (tracks: 6), John J. Mandel
Photography By – Beth Kelly
Producer, Arranged By, Keyboards – Joe Vannelli
Saxophone – Dick Morrissey
Synthesizer, Synthesizer [Bass], Piano, Backing Vocals – Bill Meyers
Vocals [Choir] – The John McCarthy Choir (tracks: 7 to 10)
Vocals, Producer, Arranged By – Gino Vannelli

Technical personnel
 Jon Kelly – Remixing
 Norm Kinney – Engineer
 John Kurlander – Engineer
 Steve Prestage – Assistant Engineer
 Fabio Nicoli – Art Direction
 Roland Young – Art Direction

Musicians
 Gino Vannelli – lead vocals
 Joe Vannelli – Fender Rhodes, piano, programming, synthesizer, synthesizer arrangements, synthesizer string arrangement, backing vocals
 Bill Meyers – piano, synthesizer, synthesizer bass, backing vocals
 Nyboma Mwan Dido – bongos, congas
 Jay Graydon – guitar
 Casey Scheuerell - drums
 John J. Mandel – percussion, timbales
 Chris Rhyne – keyboards, synthesizer bass
 Royal Philharmonic Orchestra – orchestra on "Black and Blue" and "A Pauper in Paradise"

Technical personnel
 Jon Kelly – Remixing
 Norm Kinney – Engineer
 John Kurlander – Engineer
 Steve Prestage – Assistant Engineer
 Fabio Nicoli – Art Direction
 Roland Young – Art Direction

Charts

Notes

References

Gino Vannelli albums
1977 albums
A&M Records albums